The women's 3000 metres walk event  at the 1991 IAAF World Indoor Championships was held on 8 and 10 March.

Medalists

Results

Heats

Final

References

Walk
Racewalking at the IAAF World Indoor Championships
1991 in women's athletics